The Lyon astronomical clock is a seventeenth-century astronomical clock in Lyon Cathedral.

History and description

The 9 metre tall clock is installed in the cathedral of Lyon. An astrolabe indicates the date and position of the Moon, Sun, and Earth, as well as the stars. The first documentary evidence of an astronomical clock in the cathedral is from 1383 but this was destroyed in 1562. In 1661 it was reconstructed by Guillaume Nourrisson. During the French Revolution, all royal insignia was removed. The last restoration in 1954 reset the clock's perpetual calendar of 66 years. It will be accurate until 2019.

The central tower octagon supports several automated figures. After the angel on the left turns the hourglass, an angel on the right keeps the time for the three angels who strike bells to sound the hymn of Saint Jean-Baptiste. The Virgin Mary kneels in a chapel, and turns to the Angel Gabriel as he opens the chapel door, while a dove descends, representing the Holy Spirit. A Swiss Guard rotates around the dome. Movement stops at the sounding of the hour.

In a western niche, a statue rotates at midnight. On Sunday, it is Jesus resurrected; Monday: his death; Tuesday: St. John the Baptist; Wednesday: St. Stephen (patron saint of the ancient basilica) holding the palm of martyrs; Thursday: a child with chalice and host; Friday: a child with the symbols of crucifixion; on Saturday: the Virgin Mary.

The clock is currently inactive and has been since 2013. A notice on the clock says the clock will be repaired along with other planned repairs on the church interior.

References

External links
Atlas Obscura

Astronomical clocks in France
Buildings and structures in Lyon
Articles containing video clips